The 1978 VFL Grand Final was an Australian rules football game contested between the Hawthorn Football Club and North Melbourne Football Club at the Melbourne Cricket Ground on 30 September 1978. It was the 82nd annual Grand Final of the Victorian Football League, staged to determine the premiers for the 1978 VFL season. The match, attended by 101,704 spectators, was won by Hawthorn by a margin of 18 points, marking that club's fourth premiership victory.

Background

It was the third time in four seasons that these two sides met in a Grand Final while North Melbourne was competing in its fifth successive Grand Final. They were the reigning premiers, having defeated Collingwood in the 1977 VFL Grand Final.

At the conclusion of the regular home-and-away season, North Melbourne had finished on top of the VFL ladder with 16 wins and 6 losses. Hawthorn had finished second, also with 16 wins but with an inferior percentage.

In the finals series leading up to the Grand Final, Hawthorn comfortably defeated Collingwood in the Qualifying Final by 56 points before beating North Melbourne by 10 points in the Second Semi-Final to progress to the Grand Final. North Melbourne, after their Second Semi-Final loss, defeated Collingwood by 12 points in the Preliminary Final to progress to the Grand Final.

In the week leading up to the Grand Final, North Melbourne's Malcolm Blight was awarded the Brownlow Medal.

Match summary
North Melbourne went into the game without a number of players from the previous season's premiership victory - star full-back David Dench, who had injured his knee in Round 3, ruckman Peter Keenan, who had received a two-match suspension for striking Hawthorn captain Don Scott in the last quarter of the semi-final, and injured utilities Steven Icke and Brent Crosswell.

First quarter
Hawthorn got off to a fast start, with forward Michael Moncrieff kicking three goals (including two goals in the first two minutes of the game), and they led by nineteen points at quarter time.

Second quarter
North Melbourne hit their stride in the second quarter, with Phil Baker became the focal point of the North attack and taking the mark of the year over Ian Paton. He helped North kick five goals to two to lead by four points at half time.

Third quarter
Hawthorn ultimately finished victors thanks largely to a strong third quarter which saw them kick 7 goals whilst closing down the Kangaroos. The turning point occurred when two North Melbourne players spoiled each other in the goal square at the 6-minute mark, when a mark and a goal could have put them 17 points up.  The Hawks went on to dominate play after this incident, and never looked back, kicking 6.3 to North's one behind in the next 12 minutes.

Fourth quarter
The teams traded goals in the fourth quarter but by that time the damage was done for the Kangaroos, as they were not able to make up ground. After being flattened off the ball, Peter Knights was moved forward, kicking two goals then taking a spectacular mark beside the point post which rivalled Phil Baker's mark.

For the victors, Leigh Matthews was considered best on ground with 28 disposals and four goals, lifting his game when the result was on the line. Also important was Robert DiPierdomenico, who gave Hawthorn considerable attacking drive off half back and kept his opponent Arnold Briedis, considered by Hawthorn to be North's most dangerous forward, quiet for most of the match. Terry Wallace capped off an outstanding debut season with a prominent midfield performance, gathering 21 kicks.

Besides the loss of Keenan, Icke and Crosswell before the match, North lost Malcolm Blight early with a torn groin muscle after just five minutes, and Stan Alves also limped off in the second quarter.

Epilogue
The Kangaroos' loss represented another instance in which the team which had finished first at the end of the home and away season lost the Grand Final. Since the final five finals system began in 1972, only Carlton (1972) and Richmond (1974) had won premierships from that position.

This win represented the first for David Parkin as coach. He had previously captained the Hawks to the 1971 VFL Grand Final victory, and later went on to coach Carlton to premierships in the 1980s and 1990s.

Hawthorn's next success came five years later, when they won the 1983 VFL Grand Final against Essendon. It would take another 18 years for North Melbourne to appear in another premiership decider, when it defeated the Sydney Swans in the 1996 AFL Grand Final.

Teams

Scoreboard

References

External links
Hawks Headquarters page on the grand final

See also
 1978 VFL season

VFL/AFL Grand Finals
Grand
Hawthorn Football Club
North Melbourne Football Club